Propiconazole is a triazole fungicide, also known as a DMI, or demethylation inhibiting fungicide due to its binding with and inhibiting the 14-alpha demethylase enzyme from demethylating a precursor to ergosterol.  Without this demethylation step, the ergosterols are not incorporated into the growing fungal cell membranes, and cellular growth is stopped.

Agriculture
Propiconazole is used agriculturally as a systemic fungicide on turfgrasses grown for seed and aesthetic or athletic value, wheat, mushrooms, corn, wild rice, peanuts, almonds, sorghum, oats, pecans, apricots, peaches, nectarines, plums, prunes and lemons. It is also used in combination with permethrin in formulations of wood preserver.  Propiconazole is a mixture of four stereoisomers and was first developed in 1979 by Janssen Pharmaceutica. Propiconazole exhibits strong anti-feeding properties against the keratin-digesting Australian carpet beetle Anthrenocerus australis.

References

External links
 Non-CCA Wood Preservatives: Guide to Selected Resources - National Pesticide Information Center
 

Aromatase inhibitors
Fungicides
Lanosterol 14α-demethylase inhibitors
Triazoles